The Centro Cultural Ricardo Rojas (CCRR, "Ricardo Rojas Cultural Center") is a cultural center in Buenos Aires, Argentina. It is owned and operated by the University of Buenos Aires (UBA), the country's largest university. It is named after journalist and writer Ricardo Rojas (1882–1957), who served as the university's rector from 1926 to 1930.

The cultural center organizes conferences, expositions, workshops, courses and contests both on a national and international scale. It also counts with a digital repository of books, texts, magazines and catalogues available for free, covering a wide array of topics. According to the UBA Secretariat of Institutional Relations, Culture and Communication, which operates the center, up to 900 workshops and courses are taught at the CCRR every semester, attracting over 100 thousand visitors each year.

The CCRR was founded in 1984, in the aftermath of the last military dictatorship and in a context of social awakening. The building itself previously housed the Faculty of Medical Sciences students' union. The center quickly became an important meeting place and groundwork for visual artists upon the opening of the Galería del Rojas.

The CCRR is located on Avenida Corrientes in the central Buenos Aires neighborhood of Balvanera. Adjacent to it is Cine Cosmos, a restored cinema also owned and operated by the University of Buenos Aires.

References

External links
 
Centro Cultural Ricardo Rojas on VADB 

1984 establishments in Argentina
Arts centres in Argentina
Rojas, Centro Cultural
Arts organizations established in the 1980s
Organizations established in 1984
Tourist attractions in Buenos Aires
University of Buenos Aires